This is a list of women who had been appointed as leaders of constituent states and dependent territories. This list also separates between the dependent territory leaders and the autonomous area leaders.

Female chief executives of a constituent country or state

Italics denotes an acting chief executive

Female heads of government of a constituent country or state

z

Female viceregal representatives of a constituent country or representatives to the government

Dependent, autonomous and insular territories

Italics denotes an acting head of territories and territories that are defunct.

See also

List of current dependent territory leaders
List of first women governors and/or chief ministers
 Lists of female state governors

Notes

External links
 http://www.guide2womenleaders.com/Governors_External.htm
 http://guide2womenleaders.com/Premier_Ministers_External.htm

Dependent territories
Constituent